Run and Hide may refer to:

"Run & Hide" (The Automatic song), a 2010 song by The Automatic
"Run & Hide" (Gracia Baur song), a 2005 song by Gracia Baur
"Run and Hide", a song by Algebra from Purpose
"Run and Hide", a song by Anna Chalon
"Run and Hide", a song by Blackfoot from Strikes
"Run and Hide", a song by Jay Electronica
"Run and Hide", a song by The Uniques
"Run and Hide", a song by Sabrina Carpenter from Evolution
"Run and Hide (The Gun Song)", a song by Status Quo from Bula Quo!